Gyanjyoti Higher Secondary School, situated at Rajgadh is a school of Jhapa district located south-east of the headquarters Chandragadhi. Established in 1994 (2051 BS), it is providing quality education to the students. Initially started as primary level at Mr. Narayan Dhakal's house (former Principal) in 1949 BS, it has got its registration since 2051 BS. Later in 2057 BS, it produced the first S.L.C. Batch.

References 

Secondary schools in Nepal
Jhapa District
Educational institutions established in 1994
1994 establishments in Nepal